Tendring District is a local government district in north-east Essex, England. It extends from the River Stour in the north, to the coast and the River Colne in the south, with the coast to the east and the city of Colchester to the west. Its council is based in Clacton-on-Sea. Towns in the district include Frinton-on-Sea, Walton-on-the-Naze, Brightlingsea and Harwich. Large villages in the district include St Osyth and Great Bentley.

Sometimes referred to as the Tendring Peninsula, the district was formed on 1 April 1974 by a merger of the borough of Harwich with Brightlingsea Urban District, Clacton and Frinton and Walton urban districts, and Tendring Rural District. The name Tendring comes from the ancient Tendring Hundred which is named after the small Tendring village at the centre of the area. The Tendring Poor Law Union covered the same area as the present district.

During the English civil war, the self-appointed Witchfinder General Matthew Hopkins carried out many trials throughout this and the surrounding area, especially in the town of Manningtree and village of Mistley on the River Stour.

The largest town in the Tendring district is Clacton-on-Sea, with a population of 53,000.

Etymology
Theories about the origin of its name:
From Anglo-Saxon tynder = "tinder": "place where tinder or fuel is gathered"
From the German placename Tündern in Lower Saxony (old spelling Tundiriun) and Anglo-Saxon -ing or -ingas: "people who came across the sea from Tündern"

Topography
The highest part of the district is a low (35 metres) ridge running west to east only 3 km south of the River Stour. The greater part of the district is undulating land sloping very gently to the south which is traversed by a number of streams.

Demography
Tendring district contains the most deprived part of England, in the Jaywick area. This area was ranked as the most deprived are in the government's indices of deprivation in 2010, 2015 and 2019 (being the most recent survey as at 2022).

Politics and local governance

As at June 2022, of the 48 members of Tendring District Council, the Conservatives have 21, Independent Group 6, Tendring Independents 6, Labour 6, Tendring First 4, Holland-on-Sea Group 2, Liberal Democrats 2, and UKIP 1. The council is therefore under no overall control, with the Conservatives the largest group. Since 2015, the leader of the council has been Neil Stock, a Conservative.

The council has its main offices and meeting place at Clacton Town Hall.

Parishes
The district is divided into the following parishes. "From" indicates older parishes which have now been merged.
 Alresford
 Ardleigh
 Beaumont-cum-Moze
 Bradfield
 Brightlingsea
 Elmstead
 Frating
 Frinton and Walton (from Frinton, Great Holland, Kirby-le-Soken, and Walton-le-Soken)
 Great Bentley
 Great Bromley
 Great Oakley
 Harwich (from Dovercourt and St Nicholas)
 Lawford
 Little Bentley
 Little Bromley
 Little Clacton
 Little Oakley
 Manningtree
 Mistley
 Ramsey and Parkeston
 St Osyth
 Tendring
 Thorpe-le-Soken
 Thorrington
 Weeley
 Wix
 Wrabness

Soken
In the extreme east of the district is an area formerly known as the Soken which was granted special privileges in Saxon times. It is remembered in the place names Kirby-le-Soken, Thorpe-le-Soken and Walton-le-Soken (an older name for Walton-on-the-Naze).

Arms

Notes

External links
 Entry in Kelly's Directory of Essex, 1894
 The local water supply company preserves the old name: Tendring Hundred Water Services Ltd
 Review of ward boundaries by the Boundary Commission for England with maps
 History notes on the Sokens
 Unofficial Frinton website
 Tendring Social Network Website
 

 
Non-metropolitan districts of Essex